Room for One More is a 1952 American family comedy-drama film directed by Norman Taurog, produced by Henry Blanke, and starring Cary Grant and Betsy Drake. The screenplay, written by Jack Rose and Melville Shavelson, was based on the 1950 autobiography of the same name by Anna Perrott Rose.

Plot
Anna Rose visits an orphanage and decides to foster a child. Jane, a very unhappy 13-year-old, moves in with Anna, her engineer husband, George "Poppy" Rose, and their three children (Trot, Tim, and Teenie) for two weeks. Resentful at first, Jane eventually forms a bond with the Roses. When Jane's two-week visit comes to an end, it is Poppy who decides to let her stay.

Anna decides to foster another child over the summer. The child is Jimmy-John, a 12-year-old who walks with leg braces. Jimmy-John initially has trouble fitting in with the Roses. He refuses to speak, punches Trot in the face, and smashes Tim's new bicycle out of frustration for his inability  to ride with the other kids. It is later discovered that Jimmy-John can barely read and must be tutored by Anna. The Roses consider taking Jimmy-John back to the orphanage due to his behavior. However, the children vote to keep him. By the end of the summer, Jane and Jimmy-John become full members of the family.

Jimmy-John becomes interested in joining the Boy Scouts after going to a meeting held by Tim’s troop. After joining Tim’s troop, Jimmy-John is eager to improve his reading skills so that he could read the scout handbook. Being a Boy Scout proves to be rewarding for Jimmy-John, as it ends up bettering his self-esteem.

On the night of a grade school New Year's Eve dance, it is discovered  that the mother of Jane’s date, Ben Roberts, has forbidden him from taking her. Jane winds up going with Tim despite a four-year age gap. Poppy goes to Ben’s house and brings him to the dance with his father's blessing. However, Jane decides to dance with Poppy instead of Ben.

After a lot of hard work, Jimmy-John earns the coveted Eagle Scout rank at a Court of Honor. During his acceptance speech, Jimmy-John informs the scouts in the audience that he had a head start by picking his parents.

Cast
 Cary Grant as George Rose
 Betsy Drake as Anna Perrott Rose
 Lurene Tuttle as Miss Kenyon
 Randy Stuart as Gladys Foreman
 John Ridgely as Harry Foreman
 Irving Bacon as Mayor Michael J. Kane
 Mary Treen as Mrs. Roberts (as Mary Lou Treen)
 Iris Mann as Jane Miller
 George Winslow as Teenie
 Clifford Tatum Jr. as Jimmy John Wilson
 Gay Gordon as Trot
 Malcolm Cassell as Tim
 Larry Olsen as Benji Roberts

Television series
A decade later, Andrew Duggan and Peggy McCay starred in a TV sitcom series version of the film also titled Room for One More.

References

External links 
 
 
 
 

1952 films
American black-and-white films
1952 comedy-drama films
Warner Bros. films
Films directed by Norman Taurog
Films scored by Max Steiner
American comedy-drama films
Films based on non-fiction books
Films about adoption
1950s English-language films
1950s American films
Films about the Boy Scouts of America